Semana Santa is a 2015 Mexican drama film directed by Alejandra Márquez Abella. It was screened in the Discovery section of the 2015 Toronto International Film Festival.

Cast
 Anajosé Aldrete as Dalí
 Tenoch Huerta as Chavez
 Esteban Avila as Pepe
 Jimena Cuarón as Calzón

References

External links
 

2015 films
2015 drama films
Mexican drama films
2010s Spanish-language films
2015 directorial debut films
2010s Mexican films